The 1993–94 League of Wales was the second season of the League of Wales after its establishment in 1992. The league was won by Bangor City.

Teams

League table

Results

References

Cymru Premier seasons
1993–94 in Welsh football leagues
Wales